No Tolerance for Imperfection is the third album by Scottish technical death metal band Man Must Die.

Track listing
"No Tolerance for Imperfection" - 4:39
"Gainsayer" - 4:54
"Kill It Skin It Wear It" - 4:18
"It Comes in Threes" - 5:05
"This Day Is Black" - 4:38
"Hide the Knives" - 4:33
"Dead in the Water" - 4:40
"What I Can't Take Back" - 3:33
"Reflections from Within" - 6:06
"How the Mighty Have Fallen" - 5:18
"Survival of the Sickest" - 2:45

Credits
Joe McGlynn - vocals
Alan McFarland - guitar
Danny McNab - bass
Matt Holland - drums

References

2009 albums
Man Must Die albums
Relapse Records albums